Postcards from Buster is a live-action/animated children's television series that originally aired on PBS. It is a spin-off of the Arthur TV series. The show stars Arthur's best friend, 8-year-old anthropomorphic rabbit Buster Baxter. Based by a backdoor pilot episode of Arthur entitled "Postcards from Buster", the television series was created by Cookie Jar Group (now known as WildBrain), WGBH Boston, and Marc Brown Studios.

The pilot was aired on December 22, 2003 as an episode of Arthur. The official series aired from October 11, 2004 to February 20, 2012 on PBS Kids Go!. Buster's interests include eating anything, reading comic books, and playing video games. Buster's personality is that of a fairly intelligent and curious child. He also believes that aliens are real. Buster's parents are divorced; in this series, Buster is seen with his father, Bo Baxter.

Arthur Read and many other characters from the PBS Kids animated television series Arthur make cameo appearances in this series, and most episodes have an Arthur character playing a minor role. The series went on hiatus between November 2008 and February 2012.

Overview
Postcards from Buster centered on Buster traveling to different places around North America and worldwide, usually in the United States but also in the Caribbean, Canada, and other places, with his father, who is a pilot for a band of musicians. In each episode, Buster meets children in the location, who show him views of their real-life families and global culture.

The sequences with Buster are animated, while the portions featuring the children are live-action (viewed from the viewpoint of Buster's video camcorder). After each location, Buster sends Arthur a "video postcard" videotape summarizing what he's done and who he's met in each location.

The children and their families who appeared in the series are meant to be multicultural and diverse and include a Muslim family in Illinois, a Mormon family in Utah, and a Mestizo family in Texas.

Episodes

Cast
 Daniel Brochu as Buster Baxter
 Ellen David as Bitzi Baxter
 Marcel Jeannin as Bo Baxter
 Elyzabeth Diaga (season 1) and Stephanie Martin (seasons 2–3) as Mora of Los Viajeros
 Norman Groulx (season 1) and Glenn Coulson (seasons 2–3) as Carlos of Los Viajeros
 Cameron Ansell (seasons 1–2) and Dallas Jokic (season 3) as Arthur Read
 Jason Szwimmer (seasons 1–2) and Robert Naylor (season 3) as D. W. Read
 Melissa Altro as Muffy Crosswire
 Jodie Resther as Francine Frensky
 Mukundan Jr as Triple J (season 3)
 Robert Naylor (Seasons 1-2) And Jake Beale (Season 3) - James

Home media releases
A series of Postcards from Buster DVDs and VHS releases of a certain topic have been released by PBS Distribution through Paramount Home Entertainment. This includes Buster's Outdoor Journeys (featuring episodes Sugartime, Meet Me at the Fair, The Giant Pumpkins, and Bayou by Me), Buster's Got the Beat (featuring episodes Beats by the Bay, Buster and Beatrice, The Music Mystery, and Buster's Sweet Song), Buster's Buddies (featuring episodes Buster's League of Champions, Best Friends, A Sense of Direction, and Sleepy in Seattle) and Buster's World of Sports (featuring episodes Winter Gold, Swimming in the Desert, Rock and Roll, and Rodeo Cowgirl). VHS releases, however, only include the first two episodes from the DVDs.

On October 12, 2010, Mill Creek Entertainment released the complete first season on DVD in Region 1. It also includes bonus episodes of Busytown Mysteries, The New Adventures of Nanoboy, Mona the Vampire, and Wimzie's House.

Controversy
In January 2005, Margaret Spellings, United States Secretary of Education, revealed that the show had explored same-sex marriage. Episode #33, "Sugartime!", which features Buster visiting Hinesburg, Vermont, to learn about the production of maple sugar, includes Buster meeting several children who have lesbian parents. Vermont was one of the first states to legalize civil unions for same-sex couples. In the episode, the word lesbian or homosexual is never said, and the episode — like all Postcards episodes — has no sexual content.

In "Sugartime", Buster meets the first lesbian couple: Karen Pike, a photographer, her partner Gillian Pieper, a health educator, and their three children: Emma, Emma's brother David, and her stepbrother James. One scene shows family photos of the three kids, then Buster's attention turns to a framed photo of Karen and Gillian together; Karen is Emma and David's mother, and Gillian is James' adoptive mother. Buster says to Emma, "So Gillian's your mom, too?" Emma replies that she is her stepmom, to which Buster comments "Boy, that's a lot of moms!"; Emma adds that she loves her mother and stepmother very much, and no other comments are made about the couple. After meeting Emma's family, Buster meets yet another lesbian couple: Tracy and Gina, and their three children at a dairy farm nearby. Later in the episode, both families get together at a bonfire, then take a family picture, with Buster sitting in the middle between the children. PBS vice president of media relations Lea Sloan said at the time, "Ultimately, our decision was based on the fact that this is a sensitive issue, and we wanted to make sure that parents had the opportunity to introduce this subject to their children in their own time."

Spellings demanded that PBS return all federal funding that had been used in the production of the episode, claiming that "many parents would not want their young children exposed to the lifestyles portrayed in this episode." PBS decided not to air this episode to its 349 stations, but some member stations across the country chose to air the episode, including WNET in New York, KCTS-TV in Seattle, and KVIE in Sacramento, which are flagship stations; and the show's co-producer, WGBH in Boston (which distributed the episode directly to public television stations after PBS's decision). It was, however, included in both the VHS and DVD version of the collection "Buster's Outdoor Journeys" which was distributed by Paramount Home Entertainment.

Some of these stations opted to air this episode in prime-time, with some following the episode with a local discussion on the controversy. Shortly after the controversy, PBS President and CEO Pat Mitchell announced that she would step down when her contract expired in June 2006, after coming under fire for her support for the episode. Talk show host Bill O'Reilly compared Buster visiting the lesbian couples in Vermont to visiting "a bigamy situation in Utah", or "a S&M thing in the East Village" on his former show, The O'Reilly Factor. After the episode had aired, Karen, Gillian, and their three children were later on honored at Provincetown town hall, as part of the Family Pride Coalition's Family Week celebration. Cusi Cram, a writer for Arthur, later wrote a play titled Dusty and the Big Bad World, based on this controversy.

In a February 2022 interview with Yahoo! Entertainment, Marc Brown expressed regret that the episode was removed from airing due to a depiction of a gay couple, and appreciated that Mr. Ratburn's wedding to another man in 2019 on the main Arthur show ("Mr. Ratburn and the Special Someone" in Season 22) was received far better due to society's progression.

References

External links
 
 Online NewsHour article covering the Sugartime! controversy

2000s American animated television series
2010s American animated television series
2004 American television series debuts
2012 American television series endings
2000s Canadian animated television series
2010s Canadian animated television series
2004 Canadian television series debuts
2012 Canadian television series endings
PBS original programming
American animated television spin-offs
American children's animated adventure television series
American children's animated comedy television series
American children's animated education television series
American television shows based on children's books
American television series with live action and animation
Canadian animated television spin-offs
Canadian children's animated adventure television series
Canadian children's animated comedy television series
Canadian children's animated education television series
Canadian television shows based on children's books
Canadian television series with live action and animation
English-language television shows
Animation controversies in television
LGBT-related controversies in television
LGBT-related controversies in animation
Television controversies in the United States
Television series by WGBH
Television series by Cookie Jar Entertainment
Television series by 9 Story Media Group
Television series with live action and animation
Television shows filmed in the United States
Television shows filmed in Mexico
Television shows filmed in Nunavut
Television shows filmed in the Dominican Republic
Television shows filmed in Quebec
Television shows filmed in Italy
Television shows filmed in China
Television shows filmed in Egypt
Television shows filmed in India
Television shows filmed in Chile
PBS Kids shows
Arthur (TV series)
Animated television series about children
Animated television series about rabbits and hares